The 2021 Copa do Brasil final rounds were the final rounds (round of 16, quarter-finals, semi-finals and finals) of the 2021 Copa do Brasil football competition. They were played from 27 July to 15 December 2021. A total of 16 teams competed in the final rounds to decide the champions of the 2021 Copa do Brasil.

Format
In the final rounds, each tie was played on a home-and-away two-legged basis. If the aggregate score was level, the second-leg match would go straight to the penalty shoot-out to determine the winners.

Bracket

Round of 16

Draw
The draw for the round of 16 was held on 22 June 2021, 16:00 at CBF headquarters in Rio de Janeiro. The 16 qualified teams were drawn in a single group (CBF ranking shown in parentheses).

Matches

The first legs were played on 27–29 July and the second legs were played on 31 July–5 August 2021.

|}
All times are Brasília time, BRT (UTC−3)

Match 77

São Paulo won 4–1 on aggregate and advanced to the quarter-finals.

Match 78

Fluminense won 4–2 on aggregate and advanced to the quarter-finals.

Match 79

Grêmio won 4–0 on aggregate and advanced to the quarter-finals.

Match 80

Fortaleza won 3–1 on aggregate and advanced to the quarter-finals.

Match 81

Flamengo won 7–0 on aggregate and advanced to the quarter-finals.

Match 82

Athletico Paranaense won 4–3 on aggregate and advanced to the quarter-finals.

Match 83

Atlético Mineiro won 3–2 on aggregate and advanced to the quarter-finals.

Match 84

Santos won 4–2 on aggregate and advanced to the quarter-finals.

Quarter-finals

Draw
The draw for the quarter-finals was held on 6 August 2021, 15:00 at CBF headquarters in Rio de Janeiro. All teams were placed into a single group (CBF ranking shown in parentheses).

Matches

The first legs were played on 25–26 August and the second legs were played on 14–15 September 2021.

|}
All times are Brasília time, BRT (UTC−3)

Match 85

Athletico Paranaense won 2–0 on aggregate and advanced to the semi-finals.

Match 86

Flamengo won 6–0 on aggregate and advanced to the quarter-finals.

Match 87

Fortaleza won 5–3 on aggregate and advanced to the quarter-finals.

Match 88

Atlético Mineiro won 3–1 on aggregate and advanced to the semi-finals.

Semi-finals

Draw
The draw to determine the home-and-away teams for both legs was held on 22 September 2021, 15:00 at CBF headquarters in Rio de Janeiro.

Matches

The first legs were played on 20 October and the second legs were played on 27 October 2021.

|}
All times are Brasília time, BRT (UTC−3)

Match 89

Athletico Paranaense won 5–2 on aggregate and advanced to the finals.

Match 90

Atlético Mineiro won 6–1 on aggregate and advanced to the finals.

Finals

Draw
The draw to determine the home-and-away teams for both legs was held on 4 November 2021, 15:00 at CBF headquarters in Rio de Janeiro.

Matches
The first leg was played on 12 December and the second leg was played on 15 December 2021.

|}
All times are Brasília time, BRT (UTC−3)

Match 91

References

2021 Copa do Brasil